Štadión Rapid is a multi-use stadium in Bratislava, Slovakia. It is currently used mostly for football matches.  The stadium holds 3,000 people.

External links 
Stadium website 

Football venues in Slovakia
Buildings and structures in Bratislava